Egzon Shimaj (born 27 February 2001) is an Albanian professional footballer who currently play as a centre-back for Albanian club KF Vllaznia Shkodër.

References

2001 births
Living people
People from Shkodër
People from Shkodër County
Albanian footballers
Association football goalkeepers
Kategoria e Parë players
KF Vllaznia Shkodër players
Besa Kavajë players
Albania youth international footballers